"Rose-Colored Boy" is a song by American rock band Paramore. It was released on March 2, 2018, through Fueled by Ramen as the fourth single off their fifth studio album, After Laughter (2017).

Composition
"Rose-Colored Boy" has been described as new wave by Rockfreaks.net, pop rock by Stereogum and synth-pop by Rolling Stone. The song also has an 80s vibe like other tracks in the album.

Release and live performances
The band performed the song at Good Morning America on August 25, 2017, along with four other tracks from After Laughter. The band released a radio edit of the song on March 2, 2018, titled "Mix 2", with small changes. "Rose-Colored Boy" impacted American contemporary hit radio on March 27, 2018.

Williams often interpolates the lyrics of Tom Tom Club's Genius of Love into the chorus.

Music video
A music video for the song was released on February 5, 2018. It was directed by Warren Fu and produced by Jona Ward. The video surrounds a fictional 80s talk show called Wake Up! Roseville, with the band members hosting. As hosts, the band members are under constant stress from executives, who scold the band (particularly vocalist Hayley Williams) for not creating a more positive environment, matching the lyrics "I ain't gon' smile if I don't want to". Williams at one point, frustrated, yells "F*ck it! We'll do it live," parodying an outtake from political commentator Bill O'Reilly on Inside Edition. The video ends with the band shown playing the song and causing chaos on set, before resuming the show the very next day, ending with Williams' smile fading.

As of October 2022, the song has 17 million views on YouTube.

Personnel
Credits adapted from the album's liner notes.

 Kevin "K-Bo" Boettger – assistant engineer
 Dave Cooley – mastering engineer
 Carlos de la Garza – mixer, engineer
 Zac Farro – drums, bells, keyboards, percussion, background vocals
 Justin Meldal-Johnsen – producer, engineer, bass guitar, keyboards, programming
 Zelly Meldal-Johnsen – additional background vocals
 Mike Schuppan – engineer, additional mixer
 Hayley Williams – vocals, keyboards, percussion, background vocals
 Taylor York – producer, additional mixer, engineer, guitar, keyboards, marimba, percussion, programming, background vocals

Charts

Release history

References

Songs written by Hayley Williams
2017 songs
Songs written by Taylor York
Paramore songs
American new wave songs
American synth-pop songs
Songs written by Zac Farro
Songs about depression
Music videos directed by Warren Fu